Pisidium globulare is a species of freshwater bivalve from the family Sphaeriidae.

Distribution
 Czech Republic – in Bohemia, in Moravia
 Slovakia
 Germany – North Rhine-Westphalia, Schleswig-Holstein, Mecklenburg-Western Pomerania
 Latvia
 Sweden
 Ukraine

References

globulare
Molluscs described in 1873